Bjorne Islands,) meaning 'Bear Islands', is an island group in the Scoresby Sound, NE Greenland. The islands are uninhabited. 

Administratively they belong to the Sermersooq municipality.

History
This island group was named by Carl Ryder in the course of his 1891–92 East Greenland Expedition, because a bear was shot while the islands were being surveyed on 4 September 1891. 

Individual islands were not assigned names, but in 1934 they were numbered I to XI following the first survey carried out by Eduard Wenk and Helge Backlund. Members of the 1934 surveying group climbed parts of the spectacular ridges of islands VI and IX (Första Nålbrevet and Sista Nålbrevet). Further climbs were reported in 1978 by an expedition of the British Army.

Geography
The Bjorne Islands are a cluster of small islands that lie in the Hall Gulf (Hall Bredning), off the right side of the mouth of Ofjord, south of the mouth of Nordvestfjord.

See also
List of islands of Greenland

Bibliography
Kalsbeek, F. 1969: Preliminary report on the geology of Bjørneøer, Scoresby Sund. Rapport Grønlands Geologiske Undersøgelse 26, 33 pp.

References

Uninhabited islands of Greenland